Sirvan Rural District is a rural district (dehestan) in Nowsud District, Paveh County, Kermanshah Province, Iran. At the 2006 census, its population was 2,874, in 833 families. The rural district has 17 villages.

See also 
 Shirvan
 Shirvan, Iran

References 

Rural Districts of Kermanshah Province
Paveh County